Dervorguilla of Galloway (c. 1210 – 28 January 1290) was a 'lady of substance' in 13th century Scotland, the wife from 1223 of John, 5th Baron de Balliol, and mother of John I, a future king of Scotland.

The name Dervorguilla or Dervorgilla was a Latinisation of the Gaelic Dearbhfhorghaill (alternative spellings, Derborgaill or Dearbhorghil).

Family
Dervorguilla was one of the three daughters and heiresses of the Gaelic prince Alan, Lord of Galloway. She was born to Alan's second wife Margaret of Huntingdon, who was the eldest daughter of David, Earl of Huntingdon and Matilda (or Maud) of Chester. David in turn was the youngest brother to two Kings of Scotland, Malcolm IV and William the Lion. Thus, through her mother, Dervorguilla was descended from the Kings of Scotland, including David I.

Dervorguilla's father died in 1234 without a legitimate son (he had an illegitimate son Thomas). According to both Anglo-Norman feudal laws and to ancient Gaelic customs, Dervorguilla was one of his heiresses, her two sisters Helen and Christina being older and therefore senior. Because of this, Dervorguilla bequeathed lands in Galloway to her descendants, the Balliol and the Comyns. Dervorguilla's son John of Scotland was briefly a King of Scots too, known as Toom Tabard (Scots: 'puppet king' literally "empty coat").

Life
The Balliol family into which Dervorguilla married was based at Barnard Castle in County Durham, England. Although the date of her birth is uncertain, her apparent age of 13 was by no means unusually early for betrothal and marriage at the time.

In 1263, her husband Sir John was required to make penance after a land dispute with Walter of Kirkham, Bishop of Durham. Part of this took the very expensive form of founding a College for the poor at the University of Oxford. Sir John's own finances were less substantial than those of his wife, however, and long after his death it fell to Dervorguilla to confirm the foundation, with the blessing of the same Bishop as well as the University hierarchy. She established a permanent endowment for the College in 1282, as well as its first formal Statutes.  The college still retains the name Balliol College, where the history students' society is called the Dervorguilla Society and an annual seminar series featuring women in academia is called the Dervorguilla Seminar Series. While a Requiem Mass in Latin was sung at Balliol for the 700th anniversary of her death, it is believed that this was sung as a one-off, rather than having been marked in previous centuries.

Dervorguilla founded a Cistercian Abbey 7 miles south of Dumfries and Galloway Scotland, in April 1273. It still stands as a picturesque ruin of red sandstone.  It is claimed that she was also responsible for the establishment of the first library in Dundee.

When Sir John died in 1269, Dervorguilla had his heart embalmed and kept in a casket of ivory bound with silver. The casket travelled with her for the rest of her life.  In 1274–5 John de Folkesworth arraigned an assize of novel disseisin against Dervorguilla and others touching a tenement in Stibbington, Northamptonshire.  In 1275–6 Robert de Ferrers arraigned an assize of mort d'ancestor against her touching a messuage in Repton, Derbyshire.  In 1280 Sir John de Balliol's executors, including Dervorguilla, sued Alan Fitz Count regarding a debt of £100 claimed by the executors from Alan.  In 1280 she was granted letters of attorney to Thomas de Hunsingore and another in England, she staying in Galloway.  The same year Dervorguilla, Margaret de Ferrers, Countess of Derby, Ellen, widow of Alan la Zouche, and Alexander Comyn, Earl of Buchan, and Elizabeth his wife sued Roger de Clifford and Isabel his wife and Roger de Leybourne and Idoine his wife regarding the manors of Wyntone, King’s Meaburn, Appleby, and Brough-under-Stainmore, and a moiety of the manor of Kirkby Stephen, all in Westmorland.  The same year Dervorguilla sued John de Veer for a debt of £24.  In 1280–1 Laurence Duket arraigned an assize of novel disseisin again Dervorguilla and others touching a hedge destroyed in Cotingham, Middlesex.  In 1288 she reached agreement with John, Abbot of Ramsey, regarding a fishery in Ellington.

In her last years, the main line of the Royal House of Scotland was threatened by a lack of male heirs, and Dervorguilla, who died just before the young heiress Margaret, the Maid of Norway, might, if she had outlived her, have been one of the claimants to her throne. Dervorguilla was buried beside her husband at New Abbey, which was christened 'Sweetheart Abbey', the name which it retains to this day. The depredations suffered by the Abbey in subsequent periods have caused both graves to be lost. A replica is to be found in the covered south transept.

Successors
Dervorguilla and John de Balliol had issue:

Sir Hugh de Balliol, who died without issue before 10 April 1271.
Alan de Balliol, who died without issue.
Sir Alexander de Balliol, who died without issue before 13 November 1278.
King John of Scotland, successful competitor for the Crown in 1292.
Cecily de Balliol, who married John de Burgh, Knt., of Walkern, Hertfordshire.
Ada de Balliol, who married in 1266, William de Lindsay, of Lamberton.
William de Balliol, "Le Scott," who issued John LeScott.  Some sources say it is probable he was a distant cousin of this Balliol line, not a son of John and Dervonguilla. 
Margaret (died unmarried)
Eleanor de Balliol, who married John II Comyn, Lord of Badenoch.
Maud, who married Sir Bryan FitzAlan, Lord FitzAlan, of Bedale, Knt., (d. 1 June 1306), who succeeded the Earl of Surrey as Guardian and Keeper of Scotland for Edward I of England.

Owing to the deaths of her elder three sons, all of whom were childless, Dervorguilla's fourth and youngest surviving son John of Scotland asserted a claim to the crown in 1290 when Queen Margaret died. He won in arbitration against the rival Robert Bruce, 5th Lord of Annandale in 1292, and subsequently was King of Scotland for four years (1292–96).

Aunt and niece
She should not be confused with her father's sister, Dervorguilla of Galloway, heiress of Whissendine, who married Nicholas II de Stuteville. Her daughter Joan de Stuteville married 1stly Sir Hugh Wake, Lord of Bourne and 2ndly Hugh Bigod (Justiciar). Her other daughter Margaret married William de Mastac but died young.

See also
John Balliol (play)

Notes

Sources
 This article originated with the 'Sweetheart Abbey' guidebook, by J S Richardson HRSA, LLD, FSA Scot., published by the Ministry of Works in 1951.
 Anderson, Rev. John, editor, Callendar of the Laing Charters A.D. 854 - 1837, Edinburgh, 1899, page 13, number 46, contains the Foundation Charter for Sweetheart Abbey by Devorguilla, daughter of the late Alan of Galloway, dated 10 April and confirmed by King David II on 15 May 1359, which gives relationships for this family.
 Oram, Richard D., Devorgilla, The Balliols and Buittle in  'Transactions of the Dumfrieshire and Galloway Natural History and Antiquarian Society', 1999, LXXIII. pp. 165–181.
 Huyshe, Wentworth, Dervorguilla, Lady of Galloway, 1913, has been condemned as "romantic twaddle and error" by the historians of Balliol College.

External links

Balliol College named its 1989-90 fundraising campaign the Dervorguilla Campaign.
 Information about the founders of Balliol College, Oxford, by the Fellow Archivist.

History of the Baliol Family in Scotland

1210 births
1290 deaths
History of Galloway
House of Balliol
Medieval Gaels from Scotland
Balliol College, Oxford
People from Dumfries and Galloway
13th-century Scottish people
13th-century Scottish women
Burials at Sweetheart Abbey